Qorbanabad (also Romanized as Qorbānābād) is a village in Dibaj Rural District, Lotfabad District, Dargaz County, Razavi Khorasan Province, Iran. At the 2006 census, its population was 103, in 28 families.

References 

Populated places in Dargaz County